Lelu is a village in Hiiumaa Parish, Hiiu County, on the island of Hiiumaa, Estonia.

References

 

Villages in Hiiu County